Mulu may refer to:

 Mulu (band), a 1990s British trip hop group
 Mulu (company), a social sharing website
 Mulu (state constituency), represented in the Sarawak State Legislative Assembly
 Mulu, Ethiopia
 Mulu, Kermanshah, Iran
 Mulu, Maragheh, East Azerbaijan Province, Iran
 Mulu Airport, an airport in northern Sarawak, Malaysia
 Mount Mulu, a mountain in Sarawak, Malaysia

People
 King Mulu (184–263 CE), legendary ruler in Yunnan, China
 Mulú (formerly Omulu), Brazilian DJ and music producer

See also
 Gunung Mulu National Park, a UNESCO World Heritage Site in northern Sarawak, Malaysia